Aggi Barata is a 1966 Telugu-language swashbuckling fantasy film, produced and directed by B. Vittalacharya under the Sri Vital Combines banner. It stars N. T. Rama Rao and Rajasree, with music composed by Vijaya Krishna Murthy.

Plot
Once upon a time, there was a Kingdom Amaravathi, ruled by King Amarasimha (Mikkilineni). His chief commander Gajapathi (S. V. Ramadas) is a demonic person whose intention is to marry the princess Vasavi (Rajasri) and grab the kingdom. Once Gajapathi catches a dangerous dacoit Ranga Raju and kills him. In guise of Ranga Raju, Gajapathi performs a lot of atrocities in the kingdom when an attack on a village, Ramanapalem, a young dynamic guy Raja (N. T. Rama Rao) chases him out. Meanwhile, in hunting, Gajapathi sets fire to Amarasimha's tent but a few loyal aides protect and secretly hide him in a cave. Now Gajapathi takes over the reign of the kingdom. After some time, in annual competitions at the fort, Raja suspects Gajapathi's dual face. He defeats Gajapathi and acquires the title Aggi Barata when Vasavi likes Raja. She silently meets him, explains her situation, the state of affairs and cruelties of Gajapathi. Raja promises that he will protect her and both of them fall in love. Meanwhile, Raja's maternal uncle Bham Bham Basaviah (Ramana Reddy), is a great magician the villagers provoke him to beat powerful wizard Konda Buchodu (Mukkamala) who lives in their outskirts, but he fails. Eventually, Gajapathi plans to marry Vasavi forcibly. At that time, the loyal aides of the king take Raja into the cave where Amarasimha reveals the double face of Gajapathi and appoints him as the protector of the kingdom to stamp out Gajapathi. Raja rescues Vasavi and takes her to the cave. Frustrated, Gajapathi sets fire to Raja's village when he goes to rescue, Gajapathi captures him and tortures badly. Parallelly, Gajapathi also notices the secret cave and imprisons the King along with the Princess and keeps Konda Bhuchodu as a security to the fort. Raja is saved by Basavaiah and with his help, Raja enters the fort. Basaviah intelligently kills Konda Bhuchodu and Raja eliminates Gajapathi. Finally, Amarasimha crowns Raja and the movie ends on a happy note with the marriage of Raja & Vasavi.

Cast
N. T. Rama Rao as Raja
Rajasree as Vasavi
S. V. Ramadasu as Gajapathi
Ramana Reddy as Bham Bham Basavaiah
Mikkilineni as Amara Simha Maharaju
Mukkamala as Konda Buchodu
Balakrishna as Govindu
Vanisri

Soundtrack

The music was composed by Vijaya Krishna Murthy.

References

External links

Indian fantasy adventure films
1960s fantasy adventure films